Mustafa Arapi is an Albanian painter, lecturer and art restorer.

Education and career
Mustafa Arapi was born on 23 July 1950 in Tiranë, Albania. He graduated from the Academy of Arts in 1979 with a degree in Fine Arts.

After graduating in the Art Academy under the guide of the Albanian Sculptor Kristaq Rama, he was assigned in the Institute of the Cultural Monuments in Tirana. His work made possible the restoration of many religious icons, frescos, paintings, iconostasis and mural paintings in different churches including the St. Nicholas Church in Shelcan, the Churches of Saint Michael and Saint Peter in Vithkuq, Holy Resurrection Church in Mborje, St. Nicholas' Church, Perondi in Berat, St. George's Monastery in Sarandë, etc. Many of the Onufri icons are restored by him.

He worked as a Professor at the Academy of Arts from 1985 until 1991. Then, during 1993–2006 he was Chief of the Department of the Works of Art in the Institute of the Cultural Monuments.

He has also been member of the High Commission of the Albanian postal stamp until 2006 and also member of the Scientific Counsel of Restoration and the National Counsel of Restoration of Albania.

Accomplishments

Arapi has held more than 20 personal art exhibitions all over the world and has also participated in the International Biennale of Ankara in 1085 and Alexandria in 1987.

He has been honored by the Albanian Parliament with the “Naim Frasheri Order” in 1989 for high level of artistic performance and has also won the First Honorary Prize in the 2nd International Biennal Raciborz in Poland, first Prize in the Onufri International contest in Tirana, Honorary Award at the Third International exhibition contemporary arts World Conceptin Budapest etc.

He has also written numerous scientific and artistic articles in many national and international magazines.

See also
List of Albanian painters

References

Modern painters
1950 births
People from Tirana
Living people
University of Arts (Albania) alumni
Conservator-restorers
20th-century Albanian painters
21st-century Albanian painters